Armando Flores (Mexico City) is a Mexican performer of Christian music.

Biography

Originally from Mexico City, Armando was number 7 of 8 children in a family of humble origins. From the time he was little, his life was influenced by the Word of God, since his mother and older siblings attended an Evangelical church. His father abandoned the home when Armando was two years old. This experience marked his life forever, leaving an empty space that nothing could fill until he gave his life to Jesus Christ at the age of 17.

Despite not having the love and company of his father, the home that Armando grew up in was always full of love and happiness. It was a family where the presence of God always abided.

“When I began grade school, I remember that the first day of classes, the teacher told us that only 10% of those that were here would finish the 6 years of grade school. I thought to myself that surely I am part of the 90% that won’t arrive at the end. My mother won’t be able to support my studies and those of my brothers and sisters.” This thought repeated itself at the beginning of each school year.

Despite everything, Armando studied accounting and law in the Universidad Nacional Autónoma de México, and the Universidad Tecnológica de México respectively. What was it that allowed him to go so far? The faith deposited by his mother in God. Without him knowing it, his mother prayed every day for the life of each one of her children.

At the age of 17 years, Armando Flores made the decision to focus his life on developing a fruitful and successful ministry in Jesus Christ. He decided to put his life and destiny in the hands of Jesus Christ.

Armando wanted to study music professionally, but never received support from his family. They always said “Those who dedicate themselves to music die of starvation.”

His love for music appeared when he was very young, and there was no other option for him than to study music “by ear”.

From the age of 17, (immediately after accepting Christ), Armando Flores began to sing in a worship band at his local church. In a few months, he became a part of an electronic music group that ministered in various churches. Within the first year, he had established his first worship ministry, the group “Cristo es el Camino”.

With this ministry, Armando Flores was able to form a part of the select group of ministers who were pioneers in the worship genre at this time in Mexico, such as La Tierra Prometida and Generación de Jesús. He also recorded 6 long-play albums, including a children’s album, thus initiating the ministry “JES for kids”. All this in the period of 1975 to 1983.

In 1984, following the direction of God, the ministry “Cristo es el Camino” changed its name and musical style to that of “La Banda Blanca”, using the style of music that today is known as “grupero”, with the vision of reaching people who liked popular dances. This was 15 years before the explosion of grupera music in Mexico.

In 1991, he founded Promarsa Music, a ministerial company dedicated to producing and distributing music with a Christian message, with the vision of giving the Body of Christ tools to reach a higher level in their worship life.

In this year, Armando Flores and Promarsa Music organized the first Praise and Worship Conference held in Mexico City on a massive and interdenominational level. Palabra en Acción, Juan Carlos Alvarado, and pastors Jesús Olivares, Wes Spencer, as well as Armando, participated in the Conference.

Continuing onward with his ministry, at the end of 1991, Armando Flores founded the ministry Proyecto JES.

Proyecto JES 
In 1992, Armando founded the ministry Proyecto JES (Project Jesus Is Lord), the name taken from the Biblical text the Apostle Paul wrote in his letter to the Philippians, Chapter 2, verses 10 - 11, "that at the name of Jesus every knee should bow, in heaven and on earth and under the earth, and every tongue confess that JESUS CHRIST IS LORD, to the glory of God the Father.”

With this ministry, throughout the years, Armando Flores has revolutionized Christian music with each new album.

Between the years of 1992 and 2008, Armando has focused on evangelistic concert tours. He firmly believes that the ministry God has given him isn't that of just a worshipper, but of an evangelist as well. Thousands of people have been reached by Proyecto JES with the message of Jesus Christ, for the glory of the Father.

In these years, the ministry that he has focused on the most has been that of a husband and father. For that reason, Armando Flores has been relatively absent for a period of 4 years. In this time, he dedicated himself to strengthening his family, since his older children were entering the crucial time of adolescence, and he wanted to walk along beside them until they reached college. This meant, (according to many), sacrificing his presence in the music world. Nevertheless, Armando says, "The best presence, humanly speaking, is that of a father watching his children grow and become happy people, taking the direction of their lives from the hand of the Lord, without the emptiness of an absent father.”

Discography

Special Participations
2000  Sembrando en Cuba
2003  Celebración Reina Valera 400 años (Sociedad Bíblica de México)

Other Projects 

 Proyecto MIES
 Serie 30 minutos
 Proyecto JES niños

References

External links 
 Sitio web de Armando Flores y Proyecto JES
 Sitio web de Promarsa music
 Myspace oficial de Armando Flores y Proyecto JES

Mexican performers of Christian music
Living people
Year of birth missing (living people)
Musicians from Mexico City
Mexican evangelicals